Gibson Lake is a lake mostly in geographic Monestime Township and partly in geographic Olynik Township in Algoma District in Northeastern Ontario, Canada.

The primary outflow is an unnamed creek at the southwest which eventually flows to the Aux Sables River, which in turn flows via the Spanish River to Lake Huron.

See also
List of lakes in Ontario

References

Other map sources:

Lakes of Algoma District